O.Torvald is a Ukrainian rock band. It was formed in 2005 in Poltava, Ukraine. Its debut album O.Torvald was recorded in 2008. O.Torvald took part in festivals such as GBOB, Chervona Ruta, Tavria games, Prosto Rock (with Linkin Park and Garbage), Zakhid, Krashche Misto UA (with Evanescence and The Rasmus), Ekolomyja and Global Gathering. They represented Ukraine in the Eurovision Song Contest 2017 with the song "Time" finishing in 24th place. In 2018, the group moved to Poland, their activity in cultural life decreased somewhat. Although several songs and clips were released during this time.

Members
 Yevhen Halych – vocals, guitar (2005–present)
 Denys Myzyuk – guitar, backing vocals (2005–present)
 Eugene Ilyin – bass (2017–present)
 Mykola Rayda – piano, DJ (2008–present)

Discography

Studio albums

Extended plays

Other albums

Singles

Music videos

References

External links
 O.Torvald website
 YouTube
 Facebook

Musical groups established in 2005
Ukrainian rock music groups
English-language singers from Ukraine
Eurovision Song Contest entrants for Ukraine
Eurovision Song Contest entrants of 2017